The 2011 FIBA Europe Under-18 Championship Division C was the 8th edition of the Division C of the FIBA U18 European Championship, the third tier of the European men's under-18 basketball championship. It was played in Serravalle, San Marino, from 19 to 23 July 2011. Wales men's national under-18 basketball team won the tournament.

Participating teams

Final standings

Results

References

FIBA U18 European Championship Division C
2011–12 in European basketball
FIBA U18
Sports competitions in San Marino
FIBA